Beit HaKerem (Hebrew בית הכרם: "house of the vineyard") may refer to:

 Beit HaKerem, Jerusalem, a neighborhood in west-central Jerusalem
 Beit HaKerem (Bible), a biblical fortress in Judea identified with either the later Herodium site, Ramat Rachel, or Ein Karem
 Beit HaKerem Valley, a valley in northern Israel's Galilee
 Beit HaKerem, the original name of the Hebrew University Secondary School in Jerusalem

See also
Carem, a town in Judea mentioned only in the Septuagint
Ein Kerem, sometimes identified with Beit HaKerem